Drug-pa Tse-zhi is a Buddhist festival celebrated to observe Buddha's first preaching of the Four Noble Truths at the deer park in Sarnath. It falls on the fourth day of the sixth month in the Tibetan calendar, around August or July.

References 

Tibetan Buddhist festivals
Festivals in India
July observances
August observances
Observances set by the Tibetan calendar